The Auburn system (also known as the New York system and Congregate system) is a penal method of the 19th century in which persons worked during the day in groups and were kept in solitary confinement at night, with enforced silence at all times. The silent system evolved during the 1820s at Auburn Prison in Auburn, New York, as an alternative to and modification of the Pennsylvania system of solitary confinement, which it gradually replaced in the United States. Whigs favored this system because it promised to rehabilitate criminals by teaching them personal discipline and respect for work, property, and other people.

Among notable elements of the Auburn system were striped uniforms, lockstep, and silence.

Prison life 

During the 19th century, prisoners had no rights nor any opportunity to live semi-comfortably. The Auburn system established several characteristics that were unique to the world of disciplinary conditions. Silence was the biggest factor among rules for the prisoners. John D. Cray, a deputy warden at the Auburn Prison, demanded that prisoners be completely silent to take away the prisoners' "sense of self". When the "sense of self" was taken away, many convicts obeyed the warden's wishes.

The second characteristic of the Auburn system was community activities. During regimented times during the day, prisoners had tasks to perform. Some of these included making "nails, barrels, clothing, shoes and boots, carpets, buttons, carpenters' tools, steam engines and boilers, combs, harnesses, furniture, brooms, clocks, buckets and pails, saddle trees...".

During the 1840s, the prison began to produce silk using silk worms and trees. The Auburn correctional facility was the first prison to profit from prisoner labor. The prison had many sightseers in the 19th century. The goal of this system was to instill good work habits and ideas of industry that were supposed to be rehabilitative.

Lockstep and clothing 
Elam Lynds, in association with John D. Cray, developed a revolutionary system of transporting convicts within the prison. The prisoners marched in unison, and locked their arms to the convict in front of them. The prisoners had to look to one side, and were not allowed to look at guards or other inmates. The clothing at the prison was a grayish material with horizontal stripes.

Punishment
In 1821 a new principal keeper, Elam Lynds, was appointed to run the prison. He believed in the disciplinary power of the lash, and used flogging to punish even minor infractions. In 1839 a prisoner died from neglect and over-flogging. The committee of Auburn and other staff members of the Auburn Theological Seminary petitioned to bring the issue of the punishments to the State government. "The law stated that six blows on the naked back with the 'cat' or six-stranded whip was the most punishment that could be assigned for any one offense."

In 1846 another meeting was congregated to abolish the use of whips. Flagellation could only be used for riots or severe cases. When whipping was prohibited, guards and keepers sought new ways to punish the disorderly. "The shower bath consisted of a barrel about 4½ feet high with a discharge tube at the bottom. The prisoner was stripped naked, bound hand and foot, with a wooden collar around his neck to prevent him moving his head. The barrel, with the inmate inside, was placed directly under an outlet pipe, where water, sometimes iced, would pour down." Another form of punishment was "the yoke". The yoke used iron bars around the neck and arms of the prisoners.

Women and the prison 
In the early days of the prison, women inmates were held in the windowless attic atop the high security prison. They shared a single room and slept in the same area where they worked, primarily at "picking wool, knitting, and spooling."  In 1838 all women prisoners were transferred to the then-new female wing at Sing Sing. In 1892 the women returned to a new building at the Auburn prison. The Auburn Women's Prison remained in operation until 1933, when a new maximum-security wing for female inmates opened at Bedford Hills.

References 

 https://web.archive.org/web/20070620150333/http://co.cayuga.ny.us/history/cayugahistory/prison.html

See also
 History of United States prison systems

Penal system in New York (state)